34746 Thoon, prov. designation: , is a dark Jupiter trojan from the Trojan camp, approximately  in diameter. It was discovered on 22 August 2001, by astronomers with the Lincoln Near-Earth Asteroid Research at Lincoln Lab's ETS in Socorro, New Mexico. The possibly elongated Jovian asteroid is one of the 70 largest Jupiter trojans and has a rotation period of 19.6 hours. It was named after the Trojan warrior Thoön from Greek mythology.

Orbit and classification 

Thoon is a dark Jupiter trojan in a 1:1 orbital resonance with Jupiter. It is located in the trailering Trojan camp at the Gas Giant's  Lagrangian point, 60° behind its orbit . It is also a non-family asteroid of the Jovian background population.

It orbits the Sun at a distance of 5.0–5.4 AU once every 11 years and 9 months (4,287 days; semi-major axis of 5.16 AU). Its orbit has an eccentricity of 0.04 and an inclination of 27° with respect to the ecliptic.

Numbering and naming 

This minor planet was numbered on 28 January 2002. On 14 May 2021, the object was named by the Working Group Small Body Nomenclature (WGSBN), after Thoön, a Lycian warrior and ally of the Trojans, who was killed in battle by Odysseus during the Trojan War.

Physical characteristics 

Thoon is an assumed C-type asteroid. Its V–I color index of 0.95 is typical for most D-type asteroids, the dominant spectral type among the Jupiter trojans.

Rotation period 

In April 2007, a rotational lightcurve of Thoon was obtained from photometric observations by Lawrence Molnar at Calvin University, using the Calvin-Rehoboth Robotic Observatory in New Mexico. Lightcurve analysis gave a well-defined rotation period of  hours with a high brightness variation of 0.56 magnitude. A high amplitude is indicative of a non-spherical shape.

Diameter and albedo 

According to the surveys carried out by the Japanese Akari satellite and the NEOWISE mission of NASA's Wide-field Infrared Survey Explorer, Thoon measures between 61.68 and 63.63 kilometers in diameter and its surface has an albedo between 0.061 and 0.091. The Collaborative Asteroid Lightcurve Link assumes an albedo of 0.0580 and calculates a diameter of 60.51 kilometers based on an absolute magnitude of 9.8.

References

External links 
 Asteroid Lightcurve Database (LCDB), query form (info )
 Dictionary of Minor Planet Names, Google books
 Discovery Circumstances: Numbered Minor Planets (30001)-(35000) – Minor Planet Center
 Asteroid (34746) 2001 QE91 at the Small Bodies Data Ferret
 
 

034746
034746
Named minor planets
20010822